When I Leave (Spanish:Cuando me vaya) is a 1954 Mexican musical drama film directed by Tito Davison and starring Libertad Lamarque, Miguel Torruco and Prudencia Grifell. It portrays the life of the bolero composer María Grever.

Cast
 Libertad Lamarque as María Grever  
 Miguel Torruco as León Grever  
 Lilia Martínez 'Gui-Gui' as Laurita  
 Prudencia Grifell as Doña Generosa  
 Alberto Carrière as Ralph  
 María Gentil Arcos as Doña Julia  
 Miguel Ángel Ferriz as Doctor Fuentes  
 Hortensia Santoveña as Mercedes  
 Héctor Godoy as Carlos Grever  
 José Pidal
 Marion del Valle as Claudia  
 Norma Ancira as Amiga de Claudia  
 Julián de Meriche as Maestro de orquesta  
 Andrés Soler as Locutor radio  
 Alfonso Ortiz Tirado as Cantante  
 Chucho Martínez Gil as Cantante  
 Nestor Mesta Chayres as Cantante  
 Juan Arvizu as Cantante  
 Eduardo Alcaraz as Sr. Dobie 
 Daniel Arroyo as Invitado ceremonia 
 Manuel Arvide as Don Alejandro Castillo  
 Stephen Berne as Cargador  
 Carmen Cabrera as Invitada en compromiso 
 Rodolfo Calvo as Hombre en subasta  
 Manuel Casanueva as Doctor  
 Jorge Chesterking as Cole Porter  
 Julio Daneri as Señor Davis 
 Felipe de Flores as Amigo de Mojica  
 Rosario Gálvez
 Ana María Hernández as Amiga de María en Nueva York  
 Cecilia Leger as Invitada a compromiso  
 Elvira Lodi as Secretaria  
 Chel López as Chofer  
 Paco Martinez as Fotógrafo 
 Héctor Mateos as Subastador  
 Álvaro Matute as Dr. Wilson  
 Martha Mijares
 Felipe Montoya as Señor Anselmi 
 Rubén Marquez as Hombre en subasta 
 Salvador Quiroz as Don Matías  
 Joaquín Roche as Mensajero del señor Mojica 
 Nicolás Rodríguez as Doctor  
 Manuel Sánchez Navarro as Hombre en subasta  
 Hernán Vera
 Fernando Yapur as Cargador  
 Enrique Zambrano as Anunciador cerem

References

Bibliography 
 Robert Irwin & Maricruz Ricalde. Global Mexican Cinema: Its Golden Age. British Film Institute, 2013.

External links 
 
 When I Leaave (Cuando Me Vaya) as presented in O Grande Amor De María Grever 1954 Leg as performed on archive.org 

1954 films
1950s musical drama films
Mexican musical drama films
1950s Spanish-language films
Films directed by Tito Davison
Films scored by Manuel Esperón
1954 drama films
Mexican black-and-white films
1950s Mexican films